Here on Earth is a 2000 American romantic drama film directed by Mark Piznarski from a screenplay by Michael Seitzman. The film stars Chris Klein, Leelee Sobieski, and Josh Hartnett. The original music score was composed by Kelly Jones and Andrea Morricone.

The single from the film Where You Are by Jessica Simpson & Nick Lachey reached 22 at the US Mainstream Top 40.

Plot
Kelvin "Kelley" Morse and Jasper Arnold become involved in a car race and accidentally damage Mable's Table, a restaurant owned by Samantha Cavanaugh's parents. Both are sentenced to perform community service by repairing the damage. Although Kelley comes from a wealthy family and Jasper's parents are working-class, they soon find themselves fighting over the same girl, Samantha. While Jasper and Samantha have been dating publicly for years, in secret, Kelley and Samantha begin to spend time together. They soon find that they have more in common than they imagined, and they fall in love. Eventually, Jasper learns of their interlude and doesn't like it.  During a trip to Kelley's home in Boston, Kelley reveals to Samantha that his mother killed herself. Samantha brings Kelley into the house and they sleep together. In the morning, after Sam makes Kelley breakfast, Kelley's father arrives and informs him he must attend college early and give up his fling with Samantha. Upon returning to the small town, Samantha's parents soon learn that their daughter's osteosarcoma has relapsed, which was initially discovered after a track injury, and now has only a few months to live. Samantha tells Kelley that she thinks everyone has their own heaven and it is made of a combination of all the things we loved in life. She says that his mother has Kelley with her in her heaven. When Kelley learns the awful truth about Samantha, he must decide if he should obey his father's wishes and go to college or stay by the side of the first girl he's ever loved. Kelley and Jasper finished rebuilding the diner and their probation is up. In the end he returns to be with Samantha during her final months of life. At her funeral, Kelley recites a passage from a poem he and Sam loved. The film closes with a shot of Samantha running through a field in her version of heaven.

Cast

Reception

Box office
The film opened at #5 at the North American box office, making 4.5 million in its opening weekend.

Critical response
Here on Earth received negative reviews from critics. On Rotten Tomatoes, it has an approval rating of 17% based on reviews from 69 critics. The website's critics consensus reads: "Critics say Here on Earths weakness comes from its script. The story may appeal to young teenage girls, but it suffers from being overly sentimental and formulaic. The cinematography, however, is lovely in how it captures its Minnesota setting." On Metacritic the film has a score of 25% based on reviews from 24 critics, indicating "generally unfavorable reviews".

Mick LaSalle of the San Francisco Chronicle praised Leelee Sobieski for her performance.

Roger Ebert criticized the film for its sentimentality.
Paul Cullum of L.A. Weekly called the film "Complete and utter horseshit."

Soundtrack
The single Where You Are by Jessica Simpson & Nick Lachey reached 22 at the US Mainstream Top 40.

"Black Balloon" by Goo Goo Dolls and "Breakout" by Foo Fighters are played during the film, but do not appear on the soundtrack album.

References

External links
 
 
 
 

2000 films
2000 romantic drama films
2000s teen romance films
American romantic drama films
American teen romance films
Films shot in Minnesota
2000s English-language films
20th Century Fox films
2000 directorial debut films
2000s American films